Mölln is a town in Schleswig-Holstein, Germany. It is surrounded by several small lakes (Stadtsee, Schulsee, Ziegelsee, Hegesee, Schmalsee, Lütauer See, Drüsensee, and Pinnsee). The Elbe-Lübeck Canal flows through the town. Mölln belongs to the district of Herzogtum Lauenburg.

History 
The town was founded in the 12th century. It rapidly became an important town, due to the Old Salt Route, through which the salt produced in the salt mines of Lüneburg (Lower-Saxony) was shipped to the Baltic harbour of Lübeck, and the Stecknitz Canal, which was a precursor of today's Elbe-Lübeck Canal. Although situated in the midst of the medieval duchy of Lauenburg, the town was mortgaged to the Hanseatic town of Lübeck, which ruled Mölln from 1359 to 1683. Back from this time dates the Möllner Schützengilde von 1407 e.V. which was founded over 600 years ago and still exists today with almost 300 members.

Mölln calls itself the Eulenspiegel town, because of Till Eulenspiegel, a legendary trickster known for exposing vices and provoking thought. Eulenspiegel is said to have lived in Braunschweig (Brunswick), but his last year of life he allegedly resided in Mölln. He died from the plague in 1350. Although his existence is not proven, there are several monuments to him in Mölln.

In 1992, right-wing extremists set fire to Turkish-inhabited houses, killing three girls.

Twin cities 
Hagenow, Germany, since October 2, 1990
Maszewo (gmina, West Pomeranian),  Poland, since June 29, 1992.

References

Towns in Schleswig-Holstein
Herzogtum Lauenburg